The  Syro-Malabar Eparchy  of Idukki is a suffragan eparchy (Eastern Catholic diocese) in southern India, in the proper ecclesiastical province of the Major Archdiocese of Eranakulam-Angamaly, which heads the entire Syro-Malabar Catholic Church (which follows a Chaldean = Syro-Oriental Rite), hence dependent on the Roman Congregation for the Oriental Churches.

Its cathedral episcopal see is Saint George's Cathedral Vazhathoppe, in Idukki township, in Kerala state.

History 
The creation of the diocese on 2003.01.15, as the twenty-sixth eparchy of the Syro-Malabar Catholic Church, on territory split off from the Diocese of Kothamangalam is contained in an Apostolic Constitution Maturescens catholica fideis put forth by Pope John Paul II in December 2002. It started with 114 parishes and mission stations.

Statistics 
As per 2015, it pastorally served 266,600 Catholics (34.0% of 785,000 total; there are also Latin Catholics and Syro-Malankara Catholics in this region, belonging to the Diocese of Vijayapuram viz.  Thiruvalla, and Christians of Jacobite and Orthodox Churches besides various Protestant denominations) on 3,000 km² in 155 parishes with 573 priests (238 diocesan, 335 religious), 1,306 lay religious (350 brothers, 956 sisters) and 86 seminarians.

Episcopal Ordinaries 
(all native Indians)

 Suffragan Eparchs (Bishops) of Idukki
 First Bishop Avoon Mar Mathew Anikuzhikattil (2003.01.15 – retired 2018.01.12), originated from the diocese of Kothamangalam
 Present Avoon Mar John Nellikunnel (2018.01.12 – ...).

Sources and external links 
 GCatholic, with Google HQ satellite picture - data for all sections
 official diocesan website, with map, diocesan chronicle etc.
 Archdiocese of Ernakulam
 Catholic-Hierarchy 

Eastern Catholic dioceses in India
Archdiocese of Ernakulam-Angamaly
Syro-Malabar Catholic dioceses
Christian organizations established in 2002
Roman Catholic dioceses and prelatures established in the 21st century
2002 establishments in Kerala